Indrajayavarman or Indravarman IV and also known as Srindrajayavarman was the ruler of Khmer empire from 1308-1327, and was succeeded by Jayavarmadiparamesvara.  Charles Higham states this is the last Sanskrit record of Angkor.

History

Information about Indrajayavarman was obtained from four inscriptions and the meager statements in Chinese dynastic history:

The inscription of Vat Kok Khpos, dated 1309, says the reign of Indravarman came to an end in 1308. This inscription speaks of the capital under the name of Yasodharapura. A re-reading, by Coedes, of the inscription of the Bayon, dated after 1327, revealed that the reign of Indrajayavarman lasted until 1327. Yuan-Shih, quoted by Pelliot, says a Chinese mission came to Cambodia to buy elephants in 1320.

References

External links
 Info-regenten.de

14th-century Cambodian monarchs
Cambodian Buddhist monarchs
Khmer Empire
Cambodian Theravada Buddhists